Kentriodontidae is an extinct family of odontocete whales related to modern dolphins.  The Kentriodontidae lived from the Oligocene to the Pliocene before going extinct.

Taxonomy
Kentriodontids have been variously divided into three or four subfamilies: Kampholophinae, Kentriodontinae, Lophocetinae, and Pithanodelphinae. However, recent cladistic studies have recovered Kentriodontidae as paraphyletic. For instance, "Lophocetus" pappus may be a close relative of Lipotidae, "Delphinodon" dividum is basal to other delphinidans, Incacetus is probably a member of Inioidea, and Atocetus and Lophocetus have been recovered as a pontoporiid and ziphiid sister taxon respectively, while Hadrodelphis, Kampholophos, Macrokentriodon, and "Lophocetus" pappus are recovered in a clade phylogenetically intermediate between Kentriodon and derived delphinidans ((Inioidea+Lipotidae)+Delphinoidea). Peredo et al. (2018) restrict Kentriodon to Kampholophos, Kentriodon, Rudicetus, and Wimahl, and remove Pithanodelphininae and its putative constituent genera (Leptodelphis, Pithanodelphis, Sarmatodelphis, Sophianacetus, and Tagicetus) as well as Microphocaena from Kentriodontidae.

Genera
 Kampholophos
 Kentriodon
 Rudicetus
 Sophianaecetus
 Wimahl
 Belonodelphis?
 Liolithax?

Notes

References
 Ichishima, H., Barnes, L. G., Fordyce, R. E., Kimura, M. and Bohaska, D. J. (1994), A review of kentriodontine dolphins (Cetacea; Deiphinoidea; Kentriodontidae): Systematics and biogeography. Island Arc, 3: 486–492. doi: 10.1111/j.1440-1738.1994.tb00127.x
  2005: A new kentriodontid (Cetacea: Delphinoidea) from the Middle Miocene of Hungary. Mitteilungen aus dem Museum fuer Naturkunde in Berlin Geowissenschaftliche Reihe, 8: 53–73. 
  2006: Sophianaecetus, a replacement name for Mediocris (Cetacea: Delphinoidea: Kentriodontidae). Fossil record, 9: 260. 
  2006: The generic name Mediocris (Cetacea: Delphinoidea: Kentriodontidae), belongs to a foraminiferan. Fossil record, 9: 259. 

Prehistoric toothed whales
Oligocene cetaceans
Miocene cetaceans
Pliocene cetaceans
Oligocene first appearances
Pliocene extinctions
Prehistoric mammal families